This is a list of museums in Denmark.

List of museums by visitors 
List of museums in Denmark by visitors in 2015

By region

Capital region

 Æbelholt Abbey
 Esrum Abbey
 Bornholm Museum
 Bornholm Art Museum
 Bornholm Railway Museum
 NaturBornholm
 Nexø Museum
 Oluf Høst Museum

Central Denmark
 Lemvig Museum
 Four Boxes Gallery
 Skovgaard Museum
 Museum Jorn, Silkeborg
 Memphis Mansion
 Randers Museum of Art
 ARoS Aarhus Kunstmuseum
 Aarhus Kunstbygning
 Kvindemuseet
 The Old Town, Aarhus
 Viking Museum (Aarhus)
 Moesgård Museum
 Glasmuseet Ebeltoft
 Danish steam frigate Jylland

North Denmark
 Michael and Anna Ancher House
 Skagens Museum
 Skagen Odde Nature Centre
 Voergaard Castle
 Aalborg Søfarts- og Marinemuseum
 Defence and Garrison Museum
 KUNSTEN Museum of Modern Art Aalborg
 Lindholm Høje
 The Museums in Brønderslev Municipality
 Fur Museum
 Vendsyssel Historical Museum
 The Historical Museum of Northern Jutland

Zealand
 Danish Tramway Museum
 Køge Museum
 KØS Museum of art in public spaces
 Næstved Museum
 Roskilde Museum
 Roedvig Shipmotor Museum
 Sorø Museum
 Land of Legends (Sagnlandet Lejre)
 GeoCenter Møns Klint
 Thorsvang, Danmarks Samlermuseum
 Viking Ship Museum
 Fuglsang Art Museum
 Middelaldercentret

Southern Denmark
 Brandts Museum of Photographic Art
 Danish Railway Museum
 Esbjerg Museum
 Esbjerg Printing Museum
 Fisheries and Maritime Museum, Esbjerg
 Funen's Art Museum
 The Funen Village
 Lightship Museum, Esbjerg
 Nymindegab Museum
 Ribe Kunstmuseum
 Tørskind Gravel Pit
 Vejen Art Museum

Constituent countries

Faroe Islands

Greenland
 Greenland National Museum
 Nuuk Art Museum
 Qaqortoq Museum
 Sisimiut Museum
 Upernavik Museum

See also 

 List of museums
 Tourism in Denmark
 Culture of Denmark

References

List
Museums